The École d'architecture de la ville et des territoires Paris-Est (formerly École d’architecture de la ville et des territoires à Marne-la-Vallée), Éav&t for short, is a fully accredited state-financed architecture school located in the east of Paris, France.

The school offers 5 programs in architecture:
Diplôme d'études en architecture conférant le grade de license
Diplôme d'État en architecture conférant le grade de master
HMONP - Habilitation à la Maîtrise d'œuvre en son Nom Propre
DSA - Diplôme de spécialisation et d'approfondissement en architecture
DPEA - Diplôme propre aux Écoles d'architecture, architecture post-carbone

History

The school was created in 1998 and designed by renowned architect Bernard Tschumi.

Campus

As of January 1, 2020, the Éav&t is a part of the Gustave Eiffel University. The university is located in the Cité Descartes campus in Champs-sur-Marne (Seine-et-Marne), and englobes the ESIEE Paris school of engineering, the École des ingénieurs de la Ville de Paris, the École nationale des sciences géographiques and École d'Architecture Marne-la-Vallée.

The building epitomizes all that has to be taken into consideration for architecture students and is made of several materials and theories: steel, concrete, glass. Cantilevers, open space and the "box within a box".

Student body

The school accommodates about 700 students. Most of the students are in first year (about 90 to 120 depending on the years), this figure slowly evolves to about 30- 50 students in the final fifth year.

First-year admissions are to be made through Parcoursup and are considered highly selective with an acceptance rate as low as 15% in 2021.

Goals

The school's goals strongly focuses, as its name suggests, on the city and its context, its territory and environment. Many town-planning classes and theories overlap with the main studio. Studio work is one of the most important features of the school.

The school, although very new, is rivaling with other architecture schools that have had a high visibility in quality, knowing that since the May 1968 student riots in France,  La Villette and Belleville architecture schools symbolised a very strong separation with the Beaux Arts school, and has since maintained a distinct reputation since.

The École d’architecture de la ville et des territoires (ÉAVT) is slowly changing this.

It has some of the most influent and important architects that practice in France and abroad as its teachers.

The school was ranked 5th best architecture school of France by diplomeo.com and Archiprep.com in 2020 and 2022 respectively.

Faculty

Some professors had the chance to have been influenced by Henri Ciriani, who was a disciple of Le Corbusier.

 Yves Lion, architect, is one of the founders of the school.
 Jacques Lucan, architect & renowned French theorist is also a teacher at the École Polytechnique Fédérale de Lausanne, Switzerland.
 Marc Mimram, engineer and architect who studied at École des ponts ParisTech and the University of California, Berkeley.
 David Mangin, architect and town planner, has widely published books on the matter. He is currently working on the Les Halles renovation in the center of Paris.
 Jean-Jacques Treutel, architect and town planner, is working on the extension of La Défense Financial District in the west of Paris.
 Jean-François Blassel, engineer, is also teacher at the University of Pennsylvania.
 Jean-Pierre Adam, architect and archaeologist.

Exchange programs and partner universities

Éav&t has partnerships throughout the world with notable architecture schools and institutes. The school is also part of the Erasmus+ program which offers opportunities for student to study abroad in Europe.

Erasmus+ partnerships

Germany 
Cologne University of Applied Sciences, Cologne
University of Hanover, Hanover
Karlsruhe Institute of Technology, Karlsruhe
Technical University of Munich, Munich

Belgium 
Université libre de Bruxelles, Brussels
Ghent University, Ghent

Spain 
Polytechnic University of Catalonia, Catalonia
Francisco de Vitoria University, Madrid

Greece 
University of Thessaly, Thessaly

Ireland 
Waterford Institute of Technology, Waterford

Italy 
University of Bologna, Bologna
University of Genoa, Genoa
Sapienza University of Rome, Rome
Roma Tre University, Rome
Università Iuav di Venezia, Venice

Portugal 
University of Minho, Braga

International partnerships

Argentina 
University of Buenos Aires, Buenos Aires

Brazil 
University of São Paulo, São Paulo
Mackenzie Presbyterian University, São Paulo

Canada 
Université du Québec à Montréal, Montreal

Chile 
Diego Portales University, Santiago

Israel 
Bezalel Academy of Arts and Design, Jerusalem

Lebanon 
Lebanese Academy of Fine Arts, Beirut

Switzerland 
École Polytechnique Fédérale de Lausanne, Lausanne

Notes and references

External links
 École d'architecture de la ville et des territoires Paris-Est website
 Gustave Eiffel University website

Architecture schools in France
Educational institutions established in 1998
1998 establishments in France
Gustave Eiffel University